Fernando de la Cerda may refer to:

 Fernando de la Cerda (1255–1275), Infante of Castile, son of Alfonso X of Castile
 Fernando de la Cerda (1275–1322), son of the preceding